Charles Malcolm Fraser (known as Malcolm Fraser) (April 19, 1869 - June 12, 1949) was an artist and illustrator in American magazines and various novels.

References

External links
 
 
 

1869 births
1949 deaths
19th-century Canadian painters
Canadian male painters
20th-century Canadian painters
Canadian illustrators
19th-century Canadian male artists
20th-century Canadian male artists